Centrum voor Gelijkheid van Kansen en voor Racismebestrijding v Firma Feryn NV (2008) C-54/07 is an EU law case, concerning the free movement of goods in the European Union.

Facts
Mr Pascal Feryn, one of the directors of a door installation company called Firma Feryn NV, said it would not employ immigrants from Morocco in customers' houses, because allegedly his customers were opposed. In an interview he said 'people often say: ‘no immigrants’.... I must comply with my customers’ requirements.’ The CGKR (Centre for equal opportunities and opposition to racism) contended that this policy was a breach of the Racial Equality Directive 2000/43/EC, as it constituted direct discrimination.

The President of the Arbeidsrechtbank Brussels held that the public statements did not count as discrimination. They were merely evidence of potential discrimination. The CGKR did not show that anyone was ever actually turned down.

Judgment

Advocate General Opinion
Advocate General Maduro advised that it was direct discrimination.

Court of Justice
The European Court of Justice held that an advertisement would dissuade applicants for employment and constituted direct discrimination. It was unnecessary to show there was actually a dissuasive effect, but the company was entitled to bring evidence to show its practices were not discriminatory.

See also

European Union law

Notes

References

Civil rights case law
Court of Justice of the European Union case law
European Union labour case law
Employment discrimination